Premna szemaoensis is a species of plant in the family Lamiaceae. It is endemic to China.  It is threatened by habitat loss.

References

Flora of China
szemaoensis
Vulnerable plants
Taxonomy articles created by Polbot